The 12 Hours of Reims (official name: 12 Heures internationales de Reims) were a sports car endurance racing series held from 1953 to 1967 at the Reims (Gueux) circuit in the Marne district of the Champagne region in north-eastern France. The 1926 Coupe d’Or was the first 12-hour endurance race held at Reims and is considered to be the direct ancestor of the modern endurance series.

12 Hours of Reims race names 

 1953: 12 heures internationales - 40th Grand Prix de l'ACF
 1954: 12 heures internationales - Voiture Sport Reims
 1956: 42nd Grand Prix de l'ACF - 12 heures internationales Reims
 1957: Les 12 heures internationales - Les Grands Prix Reims
 1958: V 12 heures internationales - 44th Grand Prix de l'ACF
 1964: Trophée France-Amérique - Les 12 heures internationales de Reims
 1965: Grands Prix de France Reims - Trophée Fédération française des Sports Automobiles
 1967: 12 heures internationales Reims

The 12 Hours of Reims by year

External links 
Amis du Circuit de Gueux (Palmares)
 Circuit Reims-Gueux (1926-1969) on Google Maps (Historic Grand Prix Circuits)

References

 
Endurance motor racing
Reims
Marne (department)
Sport in Reims
Recurring sporting events established in 1953